The NAVY 18 WP class is a class of patrol boat in service with the Estonian Navy.

The main task of these patrol boats is to provide maritime force protection to NATO and partner countries' warships visiting Estonia at sea and in ports. The vessels can also be used to patrol the waters of Estonia's exclusive economic zone (EEZ) as well as rapidly respond to potential maritime border intrusions. Similar patrol boats have also been ordered by the Royal Oman Police who plans to use them for port security.

Vessels in the class

References

External links
 
 

Military boats
Patrol boat classes
Naval ships of Estonia